Pannalal Bose was an eminent jurist and a judge who delivered famous "Bhawal's Case" which rocked the Privy Council by storm setting aside the Full Bench Judgment of the Calcutta High Court. He was the Education and Land Revenue Minister of West Bengal from 1952 to 1956.

He was educated at the University of Calcutta.

References
Chatterjee, Partha. 2002. A Princely Impostor? : The Strange and Universal History of the Kumar of Bhawal Princeton, NJ: Princeton University Press

University of Calcutta alumni
Judges of the Calcutta High Court
Year of birth missing (living people)
Living people
20th-century Indian judges